SM UB-78 was a German Type UB III submarine or U-boat in the German Imperial Navy during World War I. She was commissioned into the German Imperial Navy on 20 October 1917 as SM UB-78.
Mined off Dover on 19 April 1918 all 35 crew lost.

Construction

She was built by Blohm & Voss of Hamburg and following just under a year of construction, launched at Hamburg on 2 June 1917. UB-78 was commissioned later that same year under the command of Kptlt. Woldemar Petri. Like all Type UB III submarines, UB-78 carried 10 torpedoes and was armed with a  deck gun. UB-78 had a displacement of  while surfaced and  when submerged. Her engines enabled her to travel at  when surfaced and  when submerged.

Summary of raiding history

References

Notes

Citations

Bibliography

External links
 Scott, Graham (2015) ' UB-78 off Folkestone, Kent: Archaeological Report', Wessex Archaeology.
 Historic England project to research First World War submarine wrecks. 

German Type UB III submarines
World War I submarines of Germany
U-boats commissioned in 1917
1917 ships
Ships built in Hamburg
Maritime incidents in 1918
U-boats sunk in 1918
U-boats sunk by depth charges
U-boats sunk by British warships
World War I shipwrecks in the English Channel
Ships lost with all hands
Protected Wrecks of the United Kingdom